These are the complete Grand Prix racing results for Sahara Force India.

Complete Formula One results
(key)

Notes
 * Force India's 59 points were voided and the team excluded from the championship before the Belgian Grand Prix. The team's assets were sold and then re-entered under the same "Force India-Mercedes" name by a newly-formed team Racing Point Force India; this team was treated as a separate entrant in the Constructors' Championship.
  – Driver failed to finish the race, but was classified as they had completed over 90% of the race distance.

References

External links
Force India race results at ChicaneF1

Formula One constructor results
results